Ivan Oleksandrovych Varfolomeyev (born 24 March 2004) is a Ukrainian professional footballer who plays as a midfielder for Slovan Liberec.

Career
Born in Simferopol, Varfolomeyev is a product of the SC Tavriya Simferopol, where his first trainers were Andriy Cheremysin and Vitaliy Ponomaryov, and FC Karpaty Lviv youth sportive systems.

In September 2020 he transferred to Rukh Lviv and made his Ukrainian Premier League debut as a second-half substitute against FC Shakhtar Donetsk on 21 February 2021.

References

External links
 
 

2004 births
Living people
Sportspeople from Simferopol
Ukrainian footballers
Association football midfielders
Ukrainian Premier League players
Czech First League players
FC Rukh Lviv players
FC Slovan Liberec players
Ukrainian expatriate footballers
Expatriate footballers in the Czech Republic
Ukrainian expatriate sportspeople in the Czech Republic
Ukraine youth international footballers